In enzymology, a 1,6-dihydroxycyclohexa-2,4-diene-1-carboxylate dehydrogenase is an enzyme that catalyzes the chemical reaction

(1R,6R)-1,6-dihydroxycyclohexa-2,4-diene-1-carboxylate + NAD  catechol + CO + NADH + H

Thus, the two substrates of this enzyme are (1R,6R)-1,6-dihydroxycyclohexa-2,4-diene-1-carboxylate and NAD, whereas its 4 products are catechol, CO, NADH, and H.

This enzyme belongs to the family of oxidoreductases, specifically those acting on the CH-CH group of donor with NAD+ or NADP+ as acceptor.  The systematic name of this enzyme class is (1R,6R)-1,6-dihydroxycyclohexa-2,4-diene-1-carboxylate:NAD+ oxidoreductase (decarboxylating). Other names in common use include 3,5-cyclohexadiene-1,2-diol-1-carboxylate dehydrogenase, 3,5-cyclohexadiene-1,2-diol-1-carboxylic acid dehydrogenase, dihydrodihydroxybenzoate dehydrogenase, DHBDH, cis-1,2-dihydroxycyclohexa-3,5-diene-1-carboxylate dehydrogenase, 2-hydro-1,2-dihydroxybenzoate dehydrogenase, cis-1,2-dihydroxycyclohexa-3,5-diene-1-carboxylate:NAD+, oxidoreductase, and dihydrodihydroxybenzoate dehydrogenase.  This enzyme participates in benzoate degradation via hydroxylation and benzoate degradation via coa ligation.

References

 
 

EC 1.3.1
NADH-dependent enzymes
Enzymes of unknown structure